This article includes a table list consisting of all the heads of government (i.e. prime ministers of Romania, both in full constitutional powers and acting or ad interim), of the modern and contemporary Romanian state, since the establishment of the United Principalities in 1859 to the present-day during the early 21st century. 

The current prime minister, Nicolae-Ionel Ciucă, is currently in charge of a grand coalition-supported rotative and national union government, officially and legally known as the National Coalition for Romania (CNR), comprising the following three main Romanian political parties as follows: two senior coalition partners, namely the PNL and the PSD (at present the biggest of the two and the biggest in the current rulling coalition overall) as well as a junior coalition partner, represented by the Democratic Alliance of Hungarians in Romania (UDMR/RMDSZ).

According to an official and public agreement protocol (previously negotiated and successfully reached between the two main political parties of the CNR), it is planned that the coalition will reportedly change the position of prime minister (more specifically from PNL to PSD) as well as three important ministers at a later point during mid 2023 (more specifically at a later point during May 2023). To date, there have already been several governmental changes involving a few ministers between the two main parties of the coalition in the same cabinet, but no major, overall reshuffle.

Furthermore, according to one of the main coalition leaders (and, at the same time, incumbent PSD president), more specifically Marcel Ciolacu (most probably future PSD prime minister and next CNR head of government beginning in May 2023, according to the governing protocol and whether it will indeed be eventually respected during the next year), the CNR coalition is expected to continue governing for 4 more years following the next Romanian legislative elections (most likely scheduled to take place in 2024).

Affiliations 

The political stance of Romanian prime ministers prior to the development of a modern party system is given by the following affiliations in the table below:

The political stance of Romanian prime ministers after the development of a modern party system is given by the following affiliations in the table below:

Ad interim/acting officeholders are denoted by italics.

List of officeholders

United Principalities (1859–1881) 

From 1859 to 1862, the two Romanian principalities (more specifically Moldavia and Wallachia) had their own government each, and a cabinet, seated in Iași and Bucharest respectively. In 1862, Prince Alexandru Ioan Cuza changed the Constitution and from then on there has been a single unified central government, permanently seated in Bucharest, the capital of Romania.

Kingdom of Romania (1881–1947)

Romanian People's Republic/Socialist Republic of Romania (1947–1989)

Contemporary Romania (1989–present) 

Note: Romania used the Julian calendar prior to 1919, but all dates are given in the Gregorian calendar.

Timeline

United Principalities of Moldavia and Wallachia (1859–1881)

Kingdom of Romania (1881–1947)

Communist Romania (1947–1989)

Contemporary Romania (1989–present)

Notes

See also 
 List of heads of state of Romania
 List of presidents of Romania
 List of presidents of Romania by time in office
 Lists of office-holders of all nations
 Politics of Romania

References

Bibliography 

 Nicolae C. Nicolescu, Șefii de stat și de guvern ai României (1859-2003), Editura Meronia, Bucharest, 2003
 Stelian Neagoe, Istoria guvernelor României de la începuturi - 1859 până în zilele noastre - 1995, Editura Machiavelli, Bucharest, 1995

External links 

  Guvernele României
 Government site

Romania, List of Prime Ministers of

Prime Ministers